Kathleen Ryder (born c. 1940) is a former camogie player, captain of the All Ireland Camogie Championship winning team in 1965 and 1966. She won ten All Ireland senior medals in all.

Career
She first played for Dublin at the age of 15 as a sub in the 1955 All Ireland semi-final against Mayo and held her place for 12 years, winning the first of ten All Ireland medals in 1957. She won the first of five Gael Linn cup medals with Leinster in 1956, playing her last match for Leinster in the unsuccessful final of 1966. She won five successive Ashbourne Cup honours with UCD between 1958 and 1962. In 1965 she became the second player in camogie history to captain her side to victory in both the All Ireland Camogie Championship and Gael Linn Cup for inter-provincial teams in the same year.

References

External links
 Camogie.ie Official Camogie Association Website
 Wikipedia List of Camogie players

Dublin camogie players
Year of birth missing (living people)
Living people
UCD camogie players